Prašice is a municipality in the Topoľčany District, Nitra Region, Slovakia. In 2011 it had 2029 inhabitants.

References

External links
 
 

Villages and municipalities in Topoľčany District